Netball Philippines Inc. is the governing body of netball in the Philippines. It was established in 2014, with assistance from Netball Singapore. Its first president and general secretary are Charlie Ho and Bea Gonzalez respectively. The sporting body organizes the national team which made their international debut at the 2015 Southeast Asian Games.

See also
Philippines national netball team

References

Sports governing bodies in the Philippines
Philippines
2014 establishments in the Philippines
Sports organizations established in 2014
Phil